John Pilkington may refer to:
John Carteret Pilkington, Irish singer and writer
John Pilkington (priest), List of Archdeacons of Durham
John de Pilkington, MP for Lancashire
Johnny Pilkington, Irish hurler